Trần Quang Đức (Chữ Hán: 陳光德, born 1985) is a Vietnamese art historian, calligrapher, author, and translator. As an art historian his specialisation is the comparative study of Vietnamese cultural history within the Southeast Asian context.

His book Ngàn năm áo mũ (“One Thousand Years of Garments”), published in 2013, was awarded the prize "Worthy Book 2014 / New Discovery".

Biography 

Trần Quang Đức was born on 16 May 1985 in Haiphong city. He has courtesy names Nam Phong (南風), Tam Uyển (三碗),  Thí Phổ (施普), pen names Nam Quốc Nhân (南國人), An Biên Bachelor (安邊學士), suite names Cao Trai (高齋), Vân Trai (雲齋), literary name Vân Nang (雲囊) and buddhist name An Biên Attendant (安邊居士).

According to the old narrative, in his mother's 9th-month of pregnancy, she dreamed about visiting the daisy garden and seeing the emerald clouds hovering in the sky with completely silent surroundings. On that occasion, his grandfather named him Quang Đức. As a child, he learned Hán Nôm under his grandfather's mentorship.
 2003 : Graduate Thái Phiên High School in Haiphong; then passing into the University of Social Sciences and Humanities in Hanoi.
 2004 : Win the first prize of Chinese Bridge Competition, its reward was the study abroad at the Peking University. After the graduate, he went back to Hanoi and worked at the Institute of Literature.
 2014 : Leaving the Literature Institute to become an independent researcher. Then entered Nhã Nam Book House as an editor, at once instituted Hannom primary classes.
 2015: Trần Quang Đức was named #23 in the Vietnamese version of the Forbes 30 Under 30 list as a "Han Nom researcher". The list features individuals renowned in their own industries thanks to their achievements.

Works

Poetry
 Opine (述懷, 2010)
 Dữ chư văn sĩ hoan ẩm hậu ký (與諸文士歡飲後記, 2010)
 Tao dân phòng đảng xa sách phạm phí (遭民防挡车索犯规费, 2010)
 Ballad for the motorbike-taxi driver (車夫行, 2011)
 Bán dạ dự Vô Công Khuất Lão Nam Long hoan ẩm hậu cảm (半夜與無公屈老南龍歡飲後感, 2011)
 Recalling what you long know (長相憶, 2011)
 Recovering from illness (Khỏi ốm, 2011)
 Remembering Elderly Khuất (憶屈老, 2011)
 Giving Elderly Khuất (與屈老, 2011)
 Empty guqin (空琴, 2012)
 Như Hoằng Hóa hải than hữu cảm (如弘化海灘有感, 2012)
 Evening meeting Tử Hư at Giấy Street (暮會子虛於紙鋪, 2012)
 Tặng Tiếu Chi sơn phòng chủ nhân (贈笑之山房主人, 2012)
 Notitle for the autumn (無語之秋, 2012)
 Dream sea (夢海, 2014)
 Sensitization at the old citadel of Hồ dynasty (Cảm tác trước thành nhà Hồ, 2014)
 Diêu hạ Nguyễn Trách Am đản thần thi nhất thủ (遙賀阮窄庵誕辰詩一首, 2016)
 Travelling Linh Ứng Pagoda (游靈應寺, 2017)
 Điểm hoa trà chiến (點花茶戰, 2020)

Literature
 Talk about the upadana (破執論, 2010)
 Đại Việt quốc Lý gia Thái Tổ hoàng đế thiên đô kỷ sự bi (大越國李家太祖皇帝遷都紀事碑, 2010)
 Leisured records of Cao Trai (高齋閑錄, 2011)
 With Tử Hư to write Loushiming (同子虛寫《陋室銘》, 2012)
 Collection of Vân Trai (雲齋叢話, 2012)
 Small stories of Vân Nang (雲囊小史, 2013)
 Travelling Kim Sơn Cave (游金山洞記, 2017)

Disquisition
 Thousand years of caps and robes (千古衣冠, 2013) - Monograph
 Vân Trai vô đề tuyển lục (雲齋無題選錄, 2015) - Essay
 Collection of the dreamy cloud (夢雲集, 2018) - Poetry

Translation
 Classic of tea (茶經, 2008)
 Calligrapher (老徒兒, 2011)
 Love in a Fallen City (傾城之戀, 2011)
 Record of Cicada and Calliphoridae (荊楚歲時記, 2012)
 Chaos Changan (長安乱, 2012)
 Ballad of Tayson (西山行, 2013)
 Records of the grand historian - Basic annals (史記·本紀, 2014)

References

 Twenty-eight mansions of Hanoi Young Calligraphy Club
 A young man goes throughout thousands years
 Researcher Trần Quang Đức : Vietnamese culture is the village culture
 All of costumes in Vietnamese period piece are yet substandard
 8X-master : Researching caps-robes and making comics
 Trần Quang Đức : Only history was not created by fightings
 To become big nation by very small lessons
 80後漢喃字研究家

1985 births
Living people
People from Haiphong
People from Hanoi
Vietnamese Confucianists
Vietnamese writers
Vietnamese male poets
21st-century Vietnamese calligraphers